The Countryside Act 1968 is an Act of Parliament in the United Kingdom which enlarged the conservation and recreation functions of the existing National Parks Commission and re-named it the Countryside Commission. It provided for the establishment of country parks and gave local authorities certain powers in respect of the management of common land and of the provision of camping and picnicking sites and provided for grants to such bodies for their establishment. It provided for the employment of countryside wardens and for the making of byelaws in connection with such facilities.

The Act conferred powers on certain authorities to exercise control over boating on waterbodies within national parks and over the conversion of moorland and heathland to agriculture. It put in place provisions regarding ‘areas of special scientific value’ and access to ‘open country’ as defined in the National Parks and Access to the Countryside Act 1949 and made other amendments to the 1949 Act.

It conferred upon water undertakers and the Forestry Commission powers to provide for public access and enjoyment in and around reservoirs and forests, and amended aspects of the Forestry Act 1967, including provision for compensation in respect of the making of tree preservation orders.

The Act gave powers and duties to highway authorities in respect of the signing of public paths and in respect of the maintenance of stiles and gates on paths. It introduced provisions regarding the ploughing and reinstatement of public paths during agricultural operations and also provided for bicycles to use public bridleways. Further provision was made as regards traffic regulation orders in parts of the countryside.

Certain other miscellaneous provisions were made by the Act

Background
The Countryside in 1970 conferences held in 1963 and 1965 led to the publication in 1966 of a Government white paper called Leisure in the Countryside which proposed inter alia, the creation of country parks  near to centres of population so as to ease pressures on wilder areas. The next year the publication of the report of the Gosling Committee recommended a suite of proposals concerning access to the countryside. The Countryside Bill which was then introduced to Parliament was informed by these two reports.

References

United Kingdom Acts of Parliament 1968
Conservation in the United Kingdom
1968 in the environment
Environmental law in the United Kingdom